Bhai Ho To Aisa is a 1972 Indian Hindi-language action film, produced by A.K. Nadiadwala under the A.K. Movies Pvt Ltd banner and directed by Manmohan Desai. It stars Jeetendra, Hema Malini, Shatrughan Sinha  and music composed by Sonik-Omi. The film is a remake of 1966 Telugu film Aastiparulu which was also remade earlier in Tamil in 1968 as En Thambi.

Plot 
Thakur is a rich and wealthy man. He has two sons, the elder is Ram, who is married but frequents a prostitute Munnibai. The second son is Bharat, who is unmarried, and is good, virtuous and devoted to his family, and expected to marry Roopa. While disciplining his elder son, Thakur has a heart attack and passes away, leaving the administration of the estate to his younger son and daughter-in-law, the wife of Ram, Gayatri. This does not augur well with Ram and Mamaji, and they attempt to force Bharat to sign the estate over to them. When they fail, they conspire to kill him and take over the estate from Gayatri. Bharat overhears this and goes along with Ram's plan to kill him. He then returns as Daku Mangal Singh, his look-alike, in order to set things right. Things seem to be going well until Bharat finds himself in a tight corner when he is accused of faking his own death.

Cast 
Jeetendra as Bharat Singh
Hema Malini as Roopa
Shatrughan Sinha as Ram Singh
Indrani Mukherjee as Gayatri
Ranjeet as Daku Mangal Singh
Bipin Gupta as Guru
Bela Bose as Munni Bai
Praveen Paul as Khushi's Mother
Ramayan Tiwari as Daku Maan Singh
Viju Khote as Chandravadan
Jankidas
Jagdeep as Jaggi
Jayshree T. as Khushi
Jeevan as Mamaji

Soundtrack

References

External links 
 

1972 films
1970s Hindi-language films
1972 action films
Films directed by Manmohan Desai
Films scored by Sonik-Omi
Hindi remakes of Telugu films
Indian action films
Hindi-language action films